Ľudmila Melicherová (born June 6, 1964, in Fiľakovo, Banská Bystrica Region) is a Slovak retired female long-distance runner who represented Czechoslovakia at the 1988 Summer Olympics in the women's marathon.

She set her personal best (2:33:19) in the classic distance on April 22, 1990, winning the Vienna City Marathon. Her mark still stands as the Slovak record. She won the Vienna race again in 1991 in a time of 2:37:14 hours. Her last major marathon win was the Košice Peace Marathon in 1994 in a time of 2:40:27.

International competitions

External links
 
 
 

1964 births
Living people
People from Fiľakovo
Sportspeople from the Banská Bystrica Region
Slovak female long-distance runners
Czechoslovak female long-distance runners
Slovak female marathon runners
Czechoslovak female marathon runners
Athletes (track and field) at the 1988 Summer Olympics
Olympic athletes of Czechoslovakia
World Athletics Championships athletes for Czechoslovakia